Good Lord was a New Zealand thoroughbred racehorse owned by Las Vegas lawyer Michael L. Hines (1920–1985).

Background
Foaled in 1971, and purchased for just $6,250 as a yearling, Good Lord was by Zamazaan out of Love in Bloom.

Racing career
He was a good staying racehorse winning two Wellington Cups and the Queen Elizabeth Cup in 1977 where the Queen herself presented the Cup. The first Wellington Cup in 1977 was a thrilling encounter when he beat the great race mare Show Gate. 

He raced under the name My Good Man in Australia and won the Sydney Cup in 1978.

In 1979, on U.S. soil, Good Lord won the Eddie Read Stakes under the champion American jockey Bill Shoemaker, while trained by the late Charles E. Whittingham.

See also
 Thoroughbred racing in New Zealand
 Battle Heights
  La Mer

References

1971 racehorse births
Thoroughbred family 4-n
Racehorses bred in New Zealand
Racehorses trained in New Zealand
Racehorses trained in the United States
Sydney Cup winners
Wellington Cup winners